The Muskoday Reserve is an Indian reserve of the Muskoday First Nation in Saskatchewan. It is 19 kilometres southeast of Prince Albert. In the 2016 Canadian Census, it recorded a population of 647 living in 205 of its 217 total private dwellings. In the same year, its Community Well-Being index was calculated at 64 of 100, compared to 58.4 for the average First Nations community and 77.5 for the average non-Indigenous community.

References

Indian reserves in Saskatchewan
Division No. 15, Saskatchewan